The 2018–19 VfL Bochum season is the 81st season in club history.

Review and events
Anthony Losilla set a new record for the number of 2. Bundesliga appearances for Bochum. After Losilla tied Marcel Maltritz's old record of 156 appearances on 4 May 2019 against Magdeburg, he broke it on 12 May 2019 with his appearance against St. Pauli.

Matches

Legend

Friendly matches

2. Bundesliga

League table

Results summary

Results by round

Matches

DFB-Pokal

Squad

Squad and statistics

Squad, appearances and goals scored

|}

Transfers

Summer

In:

Out:

Winter

In:

Out:

Sources

External links
 2018–19 VfL Bochum season at Weltfussball.de 
 2018–19 VfL Bochum season at kicker.de 
 2018–19 VfL Bochum season at Fussballdaten.de 

Bochum
VfL Bochum seasons